War Is a Racket is a speech and a 1935 short book by Smedley D. Butler, a retired United States Marine Corps Major General and two-time Medal of Honor recipient. Based on his career military experience, Butler discusses how business interests commercially benefit from warfare. He had been appointed commanding officer of the Gendarmerie during the 1915–1934 United States occupation of Haiti.

After Butler retired from the US Marine Corps in October 1931, he made a nationwide tour in the early 1930s giving his speech "War Is a Racket". The speech was so well received that he wrote a longer version as a short book published in 1935. His work was condensed in Reader's Digest as a book supplement, which helped popularize his message. In an introduction to the Reader's Digest version, Lowell Thomas praised Butler's "moral as well as physical courage". Thomas had written Smedley Butler's oral autobiography.

According to the HathiTrust online library, the book published in 1935 is in the public domain. A scanned copy of the original 1935 printing is available for download, in part or in whole, on the HathiTrust website, along with a detailed description of the copyrights.

Book 
In War Is a Racket, Butler points to a variety of examples, mostly from World War I, where industrialists, whose operations were subsidized by public funding, were able to generate substantial profits, making money from mass human suffering.

The work is divided into five chapters:
 War is a racket
 Who makes the profits?
 Who pays the bills?
 How to smash this racket!
 To hell with war!

It contains this summary:

Butler confesses that during his decades of service in the United States Marine Corps:

Recommendations 
In the booklet's penultimate chapter, Butler recommended three steps to disrupt the war racket:

 Making war unprofitable. Butler suggests that the means for war should be "conscripted" before those who would fight the war: It can be smashed effectively only by taking the profit out of war. The only way to smash this racket is to conscript capital and industry and labour before the nation's manhood can be conscripted. […] Let the officers and the directors and the high-powered executives of our armament factories and our steel companies and our munitions makers and our ship-builders and our airplane builders and the manufacturers of all other things that provide profit in war time as well as the bankers and the speculators, be conscripted — to get $30 a month, the same wage as the lads in the trenches get.
 Acts of war to be decided by those who fight it. He also suggests a limited referendum to determine if the war is to be fought. Eligible to vote would be those who risk death on the front lines. 
 Limitation of militaries to self-defense. For the United States, Butler recommends that the Navy be limited, by law, to operating within 200 miles of the coastline, and the Army restricted to the territorial limits of the country, ensuring that war, if fought, can never be one of aggression.

See also 
 Arms industry
 Military–industrial complex
 Perpetual war
 Confessions of an Economic Hit Man

References

External links 

 
 War Is a Racket (online version)
 War Is a Racket
  Scanned copy of the original 1935 printing
 "War Is A Racket" By Maj. Gen. Smedley D. Butler, Read By Jon Gold
 "War is still 'a Racket' by David James
1935 non-fiction books
Anti-war books
Books about the military–industrial complex
Causes of war
Pacifism in the United States
Pacifism
1930 speeches